Walnut Creek is a city in Contra Costa County, California, United States, located in the East Bay region of the San Francisco Bay Area, about  east of the city of Oakland. With a total population of 70,127 per the 2020 census, Walnut Creek serves as a vibrant hub for its neighboring cities because of its location at the junction of the highways from Sacramento and San Jose (I-680) and San Francisco/Oakland (SR-24), and its accessibility by BART. Its active downtown neighborhood features hundred-year-old buildings and extensive high-end retail establishments. The city shares its borders with Clayton, Lafayette, Alamo, Pleasant Hill, and Concord.

History 

There are three bands of Bay Miwok Native Americans associated with the area of Walnut Creek (the stream for which the city is named): the Saclan, whose territory extended through the hills east of present-day cities of Oakland, Rossmoor, Lafayette, Moraga and Walnut Creek; the Volvon (also spelled Bolbon, Wolwon or Zuicun), who were near Mt. Diablo; and the Tactan, located on the San Ramon Creek in present-day Danville and Walnut Creek.

The city of Walnut Creek has developed within the earlier area of four extensive Mexican land grants. One of these land grantsmeasuring belonged to Juana Sanchez de Pacheco. The grant was called Rancho Arroyo de Las Nueces y Bolbones, named after the principal waterway, Arroyo de las Nueces (Walnut Creek in English), and for the local group of Volvon indigenous Americans (also known as Bolbones in Spanish). The Arroyo de las Nueces was named for the local species of walnut tree, the California Walnut. The two grandsons of Sanchez de Pacheco inherited the thousands of acres of land. One, Ygnacio Sibrian, built the first roofed home in the valley in about 1850.

As settlers from the United States arrived following US annexation of California after victory in the Mexican–American War, a small settlement called "The Corners" emerged. It was named for the junction where roads met from the settlements of Pacheco and Lafayette. The intersection of Mt. Diablo Boulevard and North Main Street is now at this site. The first town settler was William Slusher, who built a dwelling on the bank of Walnut Creek, first called "Nuts Creek" by Americans in 1849. In 1855, Milo Hough of Lafayette built the hotel named "Walnut Creek House" in The Corners. A blacksmith shop and a store were soon established by settlers. In 1850 Hiram Penniman laid out the town site and realigned Main Street to what it is today. (Penniman also developed Shadelands Ranch.)

In December 1862 a United States Post Office was established here, named "Walnut Creek".  Pioneer Homer Shuey platted the downtown street patterns in 1871–1872 on a portion of one of his family's large cattle ranches. These streets have been maintained to the present.

The arrival of Southern Pacific Railroad service in 1891 stimulated development of Walnut Creek. On October 21, 1914, the town and the surrounding area were incorporated as the 8th city in Contra Costa County. A branch line of the Southern Pacific ran through Walnut Creek until the late 1970s. Portions were adapted by East Bay Regional Park District for the Iron Horse Trail, which is used by walkers, runners and bikers. The mainline of the Sacramento Northern Railway passed through Walnut Creek. Both railroads had stations here.

With the 1951 opening of the downtown Broadway Shopping Center (now Broadway Plaza), Contra Costa County's first major retail center, the city took off in a new direction. In the postwar period of suburban development, its population more than quadrupledfrom 2,460 in 1950 to 9,903 in 1960. Growth has accelerated since the late 20th century, and the population in 2019 was estimated at slightly more than 70,000.

Geography and climate 

Portions lie in both the San Ramon Valley and the Ygnacio Valley below the western slopes of Mount Diablo. Walnut Creekthe actual waterway that runs through the townhas been routed underneath downtown through a series of tunnels. These start at the southwest end of Macy's and end just southwest of Bar Camino Restaurant.

Neighborhoods 
Walnut Creek consists of a bustling, upscale downtown with established neighborhoods in its surrounding areas. Neighborhoods range in affordability and feel, with some being exceptionally charming and tight-knit (e.g., Parkmead) while others are more rural and forested with homes on generous lots (e.g., Tice Valley). Not all neighborhoods are incorporated; there are many unincorporated areas that are serviced by Contra Costa County. A non-exhaustive list of neighborhoods in Walnut Creek include:

 Castle Hill
 Carriage Square
 Diablo Shadows
 Lakewood Area
 Larkey Park (Median SFH sold price of $1,205,000 --- Feb 2022)
 Livorna Estates
 Northgate (Median SFH sold price of $1,762,500 --- Feb 2022)
 Overlook
 Parkmead
 Rancho Paraiso (Median SFH sold price of $2,500,000 --- Feb 2022)
 Rossmoor (A 55+ retirement community of approximately 10,000 residents) 
 Rudgear Estates
 Saranap (Median SFH sold price of $1,900,000 --- Feb 2022)
 Summit Ridge
 Tice Valley (Median SFH sold price of $1,879,000 --- Feb 2022)
 Walnut Heights (Median SFH sold price of $1,802,000 --- Feb 2022)
 Walnut Knolls
 Homestead 
 Creekside 

Depending on the neighborhood, homes can be assigned to schools in Lafayette, San Ramon Valley, Walnut Creek, or Mt. Diablo Unified School District.

Open space 

Walnut Creek owns more open space per capita than any other community in the state of California. In 1974, Walnut Creek voters approved a $6.7million bond measure to acquire and protect open space: the city purchased  of undeveloped hillsides, ridge lines, and park sites. Walnut Creek owns parts of Lime Ridge Open Space, Acalanes Ridge Open Space, Shell Ridge Open Space, and Sugarloaf Open Space.

The East Bay Regional Park District operates Diablo Foothills Regional Park and Castle Rock Regional Recreation Area, both of which are located in Walnut Creek.

Climate 

Walnut Creek's warm summer Mediterranean climate (Köppen climate classification Csb) is typical of California's interior valleys. In summer, high pressure results in almost unbroken sunshine and virtually no precipitation. Days start out cool but quickly warm up, with high temperatures normally in the 80s Fahrenheit (27 to 32°C). In the winter, the jet stream moves far enough south so that Pacific storms can reach Walnut Creek, bringing much-needed rainaverage annual rainfall approximates , with slight variations occurring in microclimates based on elevation and topography. During particularly cold storms, snow falls on the peak of nearby Mount Diablo, but snow in the valley floor is very rare. There are numerous clear, mild days in winter, often with morning frost. The climate allows for the successful cultivation of many plants and crops, being warm enough for citrus yet cold enough for apples. The Ruth Bancroft Garden is a renowned botanical garden that showcases the diversity of plants that can be successfully grown.

Public transit and bike trails 

Central Contra Costa Transit Authority (County Connection/CCCTA) provides bus service throughout Walnut Creek and Contra Costa County at a modest cost. County Connection also operates three free weekday shuttles within city limits: the Downtown Trolley/Route 4 loops from Walnut Creek BART to Broadway Plaza; Route 5 runs from Walnut Creek BART to Creekside; and Route 7, which runs from Pleasant Hill BART to Shadelands Business Park.

Walnut Creek is transected by the Iron Horse Trail (running north–south) through its downtown, as well as the Contra Costa Canal Trail (running east–west) at the north end of the city. Both these trails, in addition to city bike lanes, make bicycle transportation feasible both for recreation and as an alternative commute.

Demographics 

The 2010 United States Census reported that Walnut Creek had a population of 64,173. The racial makeup of Walnut Creek was 50,487 (78.7 percent) White, 1,035 (1.6 percent) African American, 155 (0.2 percent) Native American, 8,027 (12.5 percent) Asian, 125 (0.2 percent) Pacific Islander, 1,624 (2.5 percent) from other races, and 2,720 (4.2 percent) from two or more races. Hispanic or Latino of any race were 5,540 persons (8.6 percent).

The Census reported that 63,171 people (98.4 percent of the population) lived in households, 176 (0.3 percent) lived in non-institutionalized group quarters, and 826 (1.3 percent) were institutionalized.

There were 30,443 households, out of which 6,363 (20.9 percent) had children under the age of 18 living in them, 13,305 (43.7 percent) were opposite-sex married couples living together, 2,071 (6.8 percent) had a female householder with no husband present, 844 (2.8 percent) had a male householder with no wife present. There were 1,286 (4.2 percent) unmarried opposite-sex partnerships, and 298 (1.0 percent) same-sex married couples or partnerships. 11,884 households (39.0 percent) were made up of individuals, and 6,424 (21.1 percent) had someone living alone who was 65years of age or older. The average household size was 2.08. There were 16,220 families (53.3 percent of all households); the average family size was 2.79.

The population was spread out, with 10,719 people (16.7 percent) under the age of 18, 3,599 people (5.6 percent) aged 18 to 24, 15,137 people (23.6 percent) aged 25 to 44, 17,653 people (27.5 percent) aged 45 to 64, and 17,065 people (26.6 percent) who were 65years of age or older. The median age was 47.9years. For every 100 females, there were 86.4 males. For every 100 females age 18 and over, there were 83.0 males.

The homeowner vacancy rate was 2.4 percent; the rental vacancy rate was 6.7 percent. 43,079 people (67.1 percent of the population) lived in owner-occupied housing units and 20,092 people (31.3 percent) lived in rental housing units.

Government
City Council members are elected at-large to staggered, four-year terms, in elections held in even-numbered years.

As of 2022, the current elected representatives are Matt Francois (Mayor), Cindy Silva (Mayor Pro Tem), Loella Haskew, Cindy Darling and Kevin Wilk (Council members).

County, state, and federal representation
On the Contra Costa County Board of Supervisors, Walnut Creek is split between Supervisorial District 2 and Supervisorial District 4, represented by Candace Andersen and Karen Mitchoff, respectively.

According to the California Secretary of State, as of February 10, 2019, Walnut Creek has 46,149 registered voters. Of those, 21,391 (46.4%) are registered Democrats, 10,708 (23.2%) are registered Republicans, and 12,147 (26.3%) have declined to state a political party.

Education

Public K–12 

Walnut Creek residents attend schools in five public school districts. The Walnut Creek School District (K8) has five elementary schools, one magnet school (K–8), and one middle school in the city. Some residents are served by schools from the Mount Diablo Unified School District (K12), the Acalanes Union High School District (912), the San Ramon Valley Unified School District (K12), and the Lafayette School District (K8). The Walnut Creek and Lafayette districts feed into Acalanes Union HSD.

The following public schools are within the city limits of Walnut Creek:

Walnut Creek School District

 Buena Vista Elementary
 Indian Valley Elementary
 Murwood Elementary
 Parkmead Elementary
 Walnut Heights Elementary
 Walnut Creek Intermediate
 Tice Creek School

Acalanes Union High School District
 Las Lomas High School
 Acalanes Center for Independent Study

Mount Diablo Unified School District

 Eagle Peak Montessori (charter elementary)
 Bancroft Elementary
 Valle Verde Elementary
 Walnut Acres Elementary
 Foothill Middle
 Northgate High School

Private K–12 

Walnut Creek is home to several private schools, including:

 Berean Christian High School (Grades: 912)
 Contra Costa Christian Schools (Grades: PK12)
 Fusion Academy Walnut Creek (Grades: 612) 
 Garden Gate Montessori School (Grades: PKK)
 North Creek Academy & Preschool (Grades: PK8)
 Palmer School (Grades: K8)
 St. Mary of the Immaculate Conception School (Grades: PK8)
 The Seven Hills School   (Grades: PK8)
 Springfield Montessori School (Grades: PKK)
 Walnut Creek Christian Academy (Grades: K8)
 Wellspring Educational Services

Public libraries 

The Walnut Creek Library and the Ygnacio Valley Library of the Contra Costa County Library are located in Walnut Creek. The Ygnacio Valley Branch, which opened in 1975, is also known as the Thurman G. Casey Memorial Library. Fundraising and other support is provided by the Walnut Creek Library Foundation.

On February 26, 2008, the city demolished the Walnut Creek Library, that was built in 1961 at the southern end of Civic Park. Mayor Gwen Regalia hosted a groundbreaking on the same site for the new library on May 19, 2008. The new library, designed by Group4 Architecture, Research + Planning, Inc., has  and an underground parking garage. Construction was completed in 2010 and the library was officially opened on July 17, 2010.

Economy 

Companies based in Walnut Creek include Central Garden & Pet (makers of the AvoDerm, Amdro, Kaytee brands, among others), American Reprographics Company, CSE Insurance Group, Maximum Games, and the PMI Group.

Points of interest 

 Tony La Russa's Animal Rescue Foundation (ARF)
 Bedford Art Gallery
 Boundary Oak Golf Course
 Broadway Plaza Shopping Center
 Castle Rock Park
 Civic Park, including seasonal outdoor skating rink
 Heather Farm Park, including Gardens at Heather Farm and all-abilities playground
 Howe Homestead Park
 Lesher Center for the Arts
 Lindsay Wildlife Museum
 Mount Diablo State Park
 Open space hiking/biking trails, including Acalanes, Lime Ridge, Shell Ridge (featuring Fossil Hill trail)
 Old Borges Ranch
 Ruth Bancroft Garden
 St. Paul's Episcopal Church, featuring Carpenter Gothic chapel
 Shadelands Ranch Museum
 Walden Park Disc Golf Course
 Walnut Creek Model Railroad Society

Media 

Walnut Creek is served by the daily newspaper, The East Bay Times (formerly The Contra Costa Times). The paper was originally run and owned by the Lesher family. Since the death of Dean Lesher in 1993, the paper has had several owners. The Times, as it is known, has a section called "The Walnut Creek Journal."

Walnut Creek TV (WCTV) is the city's government-access television channel, covering local government and community events. WCTV is available in Walnut Creek on Comcast channel 28 (channel 26 in Rossmoor), Astound channel 29, AT&T U-verse channel 99 under the menu option "Walnut Creek Television," and on YouTube. Claycord.com is the widely read independent news and talk blog serving the greater Walnut Creek metropolitan area.

Notable people 

Arthur Adams, comics artist
Matt Anger, professional tennis player
Dan Ashley, journalist
Ruth Bancroft, gardener, landscape architect and creator of the Ruth Bancroft Garden
Jessica Bowman, actress, portrayed Colleen Cooper in Dr. Quinn, Medicine Woman
Tom Candiotti, MLB pitcher
Richard Carlson, psychotherapist, author of Don't Sweat the Small Stuff
 Curt Casali (born 1988), baseball catcher for the San Francisco Giants
Joyce Chin, comics artist
 Dr. Alette Coble-Temple, Ms. Wheelchair America 2016, disability advocate
 TJ Cox, congressman
 Corey Duffel, professional skateboarder
 Kyle Gass, guitarist for Tenacious D, attended Las Lomas High School
 Lee Goldberg, writer and television producer, graduated from Northgate High School (1980)
 Dan Haren, MLB pitcher
 Brandon Harkins, professional golfer
 Jack Henderson, Artist
 Marya Hornbacher, author
 Sabrina Ionescu, basketball player
 Kristian Ipsen, U.S. diver, Olympic bronze medalist
Kyle Jensen, baseball player
 Bessilyn Johnson, daughter of Hiram Penniman, Shadelands Ranch owner, resident of Scotty's Castle in Death Valley
 Randy Johnson, Hall of Fame MLB pitcher
 Persis Karim (b. 1962), American poet, editor, educator; born in Walnut Creek.
 Kira Kazantsev, Miss America 2015
 Tosh Lupoi, defensive line coach for Jacksonville Jaguars
 Mark "Mad Dog" Madsen, NBA player
 John A. Nejedly (1914–2006), California State Senator
 Kyle Newacheck, co-creator, co-star of Comedy Central's Workaholics
 Jason Newsted, bassist for Metallica
 Aaron Poreda, MLB pitcher
 A.J. Puckett, professional baseball pitcher in the Atlanta Braves organization
 Markie Post, television actress
 Jeff Richards, writer and featured performer on NBC's Saturday Night Live, 2001–2004
 Bill Rigney, MLB infielder, Angels' inaugural manager
 Lester Rodney, journalist, civil rights activist
 Katharine Ross, film actress, graduated from Las Lomas High School (1957)
 Leslie Carrara-Rudolph, Sesame Street puppeteer
 Greg Sestero, actor, star of cult film The Room, author of The Disaster Artist, born in Walnut Creek
 Justin Speier, MLB pitcher
 Joe Starkey, California Golden Bears and former San Francisco 49ers announcer
 The Story So Far, pop punk band
 Christy Turlington, supermodel, health activist
 Lars Ulrich, drummer for Metallica
 Joseph R. Walker, 19th-century wilderness explorer and scout
 Johnny Weekly, MLB outfielder
 Wayne A. Wiegand, library historian, author, academic
 Sherri Youngward, Christian singer and songwriter

Sister cities 

Walnut Creek has an active Sister Cities International program with two sister cities. Schools in the city have a yearly student exchange with these cities.
  Noceto, Italy
  Siófok, Hungary

See also 

 Walnut Creek CDROM

 List of cities and towns in California
 List of cities and towns in the San Francisco Bay Area

References

Further reading

External links 

 
 Walnut Creek Convention & Visitors Bureau
 Walnut Creek Chamber of Commerce

 
1849 establishments in California
Cities in Contra Costa County, California
Cities in the San Francisco Bay Area
Incorporated cities and towns in California
Populated places established in 1849